Dúgvan ('The Dove') was a Faroese monthly newspaper. It was published from January 1894 to 1928 primarily in Danish (with some Faroese), with the subtitle afholdsblad for Færøerne 'temperance newsletter for the Faroe Islanders'. A new newspaper with the same name and purpose was also published from 1941 to 1942 in Faroese.

Editors
P. Jensen, 1894–1899
Rasmus Effersøe, 1899–1900
Djóni í Geil, 1899–1907
Hans Andrias Djurhuus, 1908–1910
Rasmus Effersøe, 1910–1915
Poul Niclasen, 1916–1925
Símun av Skarði, 1927–1928

References

External links
 Digitized copies of Dúgvan at Tímarit.is

Newspapers published in the Faroe Islands
Publications established in 1894
Publications disestablished in 1928
1928 establishments in the Faroe Islands